RaaS can be an abbreviation for:
Ransomware as a service
Recovery as a Service
Robot as a Service